Transient receptor potential cation channel, subfamily M, member 2, also known as TRPM2, is a protein that in humans is encoded by the TRPM2 gene.

Structure
The protein encoded by this gene is a non-selective calcium-permeable cation channel and is part of the Transient Receptor Potential ion channel super family. The closest relative is the cold and menthol activated TRPM8 ion channel. While TRPM2 is not cold sensitive it is activated by heat. The TRPM2 ion channel is activated by free intracellular ADP-ribose in synergy with free intracellular calcium. ADP-Ribose is produced to by the enzyme PARP in response to oxidative stress and confers susceptibility to cell death. Several alternatively spliced transcript variants of this gene have been described, but their full-length nature is not known.

Function 
The TRPM2 gene is highly expressed in the brain and was implicated by both genetic linkage studies in families and then by case control or trio allelic association studies in the genetic aetiology of bipolar affective disorder (Manic Depression).

The physiological role of TRPM2 is not well understood. It was shown to be involved in insulin secretion. In the immune cells it mediates parts of the responses to TNF-alpha. A role has been suggested for TRPM2 in activation of NLRP3 inflammasome, the dysregulation of which is strongly associated with a number of auto inflammatory and metabolic diseases, such as gout, obesity and diabetes. In the brain it is involved in the toxicity of amyloid beta, a protein associated with Alzheimer's disease. In 2016, TRPM2 channel was strongly implicated in the detection of non-painful warm stimuli. Chun-Hsiang Tan and Peter McNaughton studied the responses of actual sensory neurons to thermal stimuli, then used an RNA-sequencing strategy to identify TRPM2 as genetically required for warmth detection in the non-noxious range of 33–38 °C.

Clinical significance
TRPM2 expression and function help preserve cancer cell viability. TRPM2 channels are highly expressed in many cancers, notably neuroblastoma.

See also 
 TRPM

References

Further reading

External links 
 

Ion channels
Biology of bipolar disorder
Nudix hydrolases